Louis-Antoine Ranvier (2 October 1835 – 22 March 1922) was a French physician, pathologist, anatomist and histologist, who discovered the nodes of Ranvier, regularly spaced discontinuities of the myelin sheath, occurring at varying intervals along the length of a nerve fiber.

Career 
Ranvier was born and studied medicine at Lyon, graduating in 1865 from the Ecole Préparatoire de Médecine et de Pharmacie. He moved to Paris after receiving the internship of Parisian hospitals. Here he founded a small private research laboratory on Rue Christine along with fellow intern Victor André Cornil, and together they later offered a course in histology to medical students which involved the careful examination of tissues under a microscope. Their course was unique in the time as microscopy had not been viewed favourably in medicine especially by Henri Ducrotay de Blainville (1777-1850) and Auguste Comte (1798-1857). Their histology course material became an influential textbook on histopathology. In 1867, Ranvier entered the Collège de France and worked as an assistant to Claude Bernard. In 1875, he was appointed to its chair of general anatomy.

In 1878, Ranvier discovered the nodes along nerves which received his name. He conducted experiments on nerve growth, repair, and regeneration. Other anatomical structures bearing his name are the Merkel-Ranvier cells, melanocyte-like cells in the basal layer of the epidermis that contain catecholamine granules; and Ranvier's tactile disks, a special type of sensory nerve ending. In 1897, he founded the scientific journal Archives d'anatomie microscopique with Edouard-Gérard Balbiani.

Some of his most notable students included Ferdinand-Jean Darier, Justin Marie Jolly, Joaquín Albarrán, Luis Simarro Lacabra, Joseph-Louis Renaut, and Fredrik Georg Gade.

Retirement 
Ranvier retired in 1900 to his estate in Thélys (Roanne) and died at Vendranges in 1922.

Bibliography

 Ranvier, Louis-Antoine and Victor André Cornil. 1869. Manuel d'histologie pathologique. Paris
 Ranvier, Louis-Antoine. 1875–1882. Traité technique d'histologie. Paris: F. Savy
 Ranvier, Louis-Antoine. 1878. Leçons sur l'histologie du système nerveux, par M. L. Ranvier, recueillies par M.Ed. Weber. Paris
 Ranvier, Louis-Antoine. 1880. Leçons d'anatomie générale sur le système musculaire, par L. Ranvier, recueillies par M. J. Renaut. Paris
 Ranvier, Louis-Antoine. 1885. Exposé des titres et des travaux de M. L. Ranvier. Paris

References

External links
 Ranvier, Louis-Antoine at The Virtual Laboratory

1835 births
1922 deaths
19th-century French physicians
French anatomists
French pathologists
Members of the French Academy of Sciences